Hugh Lindsay (20 June 1927 – 19 January 2009) was a bishop of the Roman Catholic Church in England and Wales.

Biography
Lindsay was born in Newcastle upon Tyne on 20 June 1927. He was educated at St Cuthbert's Grammar School, Newcastle upon Tyne, and Ushaw College, Durham. After priestly ordination, he worked in a variety of roles in the Diocese of Hexham and Newcastle, most notably as secretary at Bishop's House. In 1969 Pope Paul VI appointed him Auxiliary Bishop of Hexham and Newcastle and titular Bishop of Cuncacestre.

Lindsay was consecrated bishop at St. Mary's Cathedral, Newcastle upon Tyne, on 11 December 1969. He continued to assist the then Bishop of Hexham and Newcastle, Bishop James Cunningham, until the latter resigned the diocese in 1974. Lindsay was subsequently appointed to succeed Bishop Cunningham on 12 December 1974, when he took possession of the Diocese as Ordinary and bishop in his own right. 

On 10 June 1977, Pope Paul VI appointed Owen Swindlehurst, another priest of the diocese, to assist Lindsay as Auxiliary Bishop and titular Bishop of Cuncacestre. The two worked together until Lindsay resigned the See on grounds of ill health. His resignation was accepted by Pope John Paul II on 11 January 1992. 

Lindsay assisted the Archbishop of Liverpool, Derek Worlock, at the consecration of his successor, Bishop Ambrose Griffiths, on 20 March 1992. Until his death, Lindsay took up residence in the Diocese of Lancaster and continued to be an active member of the Catholic Bishops' Conference of England and Wales.

Death
Lindsay died suddenly on 19 January 2009, aged 81 at Boarbank Hall, his retirement home in Grange over Sands, Cumbria.

See also

References

External links
St Mary's Cathedral, Newcastle upon Tyne
Catholic Hierarchy

1927 births
2009 deaths
People from Newcastle upon Tyne
20th-century Roman Catholic bishops in England
Roman Catholic bishops of Hexham and Newcastle
People educated at St. Cuthbert's School
Alumni of Ushaw College